George P. Lord (July 25, 1831 – July 11, 1917) was an American merchant, banker and politician from New York.

Life
He was born on July 25, 1831, in Barrington, Yates County, New York, the son of Benjamin M. Lord and Elizabeth (Fleming) Lord. He graduated from Genesee Wesleyan Seminary, and in 1856 from Hobart College. Then he went to the Minnesota Territory and engaged in surveying and teaching. In 1859, he returned to Yates County, and married Eliza Ann Bunce (1838–1898). He taught school, engaged in farming, and was County School Commissioner from 1861 to 1866.

He was a member of the New York State Assembly (Yates Co.) in 1871 and 1872.

In 1878, he became a partner in a grain, malt and coal business.

He was a member of the New York State Senate (28th D.) from 1880 to 1883, sitting in the 103rd, 104th, 105th and 106th New York State Legislatures.

In 1891, he was elected President of the Dundee State Bank.

On January 20, 1896, he was appointed as a member of the New York State Civil Service Commission, and remained in office until 1899.

He died on July 11, 1917, at his home in Dundee, New York, of a stroke.

Sources
 Civil List and Constitutional History of the Colony and State of New York compiled by Edgar Albert Werner (1884; pg. 291 and 370)
 THE MACHINE FIGHTING FOR LORD in NYT on January 16, 1896
 LORD ENDORSES HIMSELF in NYT on January 21, 1896
 Obituary Notes; GEORGE P. LORD in NYT on July 14, 1917
 Obit transcribed from a Dundee newspaper

1831 births
1917 deaths
Republican Party New York (state) state senators
People from Yates County, New York
Hobart and William Smith Colleges alumni
Republican Party members of the New York State Assembly
19th-century American politicians